Midville is a small village and civil parish in the East Lindsey district of Lincolnshire, England.

The village was an extra-parochial allotment of the East Fen, which was drained between 1802 and 1813, and was constituted as a parochial township by an act of Parliament passed in 1885.  The East Fen is between Boston and Spilsby.

Midville church was built in 1819–20 and is a plain edifice of Georgian brick.

Midville railway station opened in 1913, and closed in 1970.

References

External links

Villages in Lincolnshire
Civil parishes in Lincolnshire
East Lindsey District